The Pomahaka River is in South Otago in New Zealand's South Island. Along its path it passes the Blue Mountains and the forestry town of Tapanui in the area known locally as West Otago.

For a short part of its length, the river forms the boundary between Otago and Southland regions.

Major flooding of the Pomahaka in 1978 led to the relocation of the town of Kelso and caused damage severe enough to lead to the closure of the Tapanui Branch railway.

Rivers of Otago
Rivers of Southland, New Zealand
Rivers of New Zealand
Tributaries of the Clutha River